Greatest Hits, Vol. 1 is a 2001 greatest hits album by Blue Rodeo. It was released in the United States in 2004.

Track listing
All songs by Greg Keelor and Jim Cuddy, except where noted.

"To Love Somebody"  – 5:48 - Barry Gibb, Robin Gibb
"Rose-Coloured Glasses"  – 4:28
"Try"  – 4:00
"Diamond Mine"  – 8:08
"Til I Am Myself Again"  – 4:00
"Trust Yourself"  – 3:34
"Lost Together"  – 5:14
"5 Days in May"  – 7:10
"Hasn't Hit Me Yet"  – 5:11
"Bad Timing"  – 5:03
"Dark Angel"  – 5:18
"Side of the Road"  – 6:05
"It Could Happen to You"  – 4:35
"After the Rain"  – 6:43

Track trivia
This album collects singles from all of their albums to that point, except from The Days In Between.
This album includes a cover of "To Love Somebody" by The Bee Gees.
"After the Rain", from 1990's Casino, is included with a new, re-recorded version featuring the band's then-present line-up plus a horn section.
The US release contains Palace of Gold's single "Bulletproof" in place of "It Could Happen to You".

Charts

Weekly charts

Year-end charts

Certifications

References

2001 greatest hits albums
Blue Rodeo albums
Albums produced by Terry Brown (record producer)
Albums produced by Pete Anderson